Kasua is a Papuan language of Papua New Guinea.

Phonology

Consonants

Vowels

Orthography

References 

Bosavi languages
Languages of Gulf Province
Languages of Southern Highlands Province
Languages of Western Province (Papua New Guinea)